Benhar is a town in New Zealand. It is located five kilometres east of Balclutha in South Otago, close to the small Lake Tuakitoto.

Benhar was formerly the site of one of New Zealand's largest domestic porcelain factories, closing in 1990 after a large fire destroyed the factory and surrounding warehouses. The factory initially started manufacturing ceramic pipes and bricks, supplying the rapid growth of Dunedin's infrastructure before diversifying into pottery ware and then sanitary ware which was freighted from the factory's own rail yard.

Demographics
Benhar is described by Statistics New Zealand as a rural settlement.

Benhar had a population of 90 at the 2018 New Zealand census, a decrease of 9 people (−9.1%) since the 2013 census, and a decrease of 6 people (−6.2%) since the 2006 census. There were 39 households. There were 51 males and 39 females, giving a sex ratio of 1.31 males per female. The median age was 37.6 years (compared with 37.4 years nationally), with 18 people (20.0%) aged under 15 years, 18 (20.0%) aged 15 to 29, 48 (53.3%) aged 30 to 64, and 9 (10.0%) aged 65 or older.

Ethnicities were 86.7% European/Pākehā, 16.7% Māori, and 6.7% Asian (totals add to more than 100% since people could identify with multiple ethnicities).

Although some people objected to giving their religion, 50.0% had no religion, 33.3% were Christian, 3.3% were Muslim and 10.0% had other religions.

Of those at least 15 years old, 9 (12.5%) people had a bachelor or higher degree, and 18 (25.0%) people had no formal qualifications. The median income was $38,300, compared with $31,800 nationally. The employment status of those at least 15 was that 42 (58.3%) people were employed full-time, 9 (12.5%) were part-time, and 6 (8.3%) were unemployed.

See also
Peter McSkimming

References

Populated places in Otago
Clutha District